Jimmy Connors defeated Björn Borg in the final, 6–4, 6–2, 6–2 to win the men's singles tennis title at the 1978 US Open. The final was watched by a sell-out crowd of 19,537 spectators.

This was the first edition of the US Open to be played on hard courts.

Guillermo Vilas was the defending champion, but lost in the fourth round to Butch Walts.

Seeds
The seeded players are listed below. Jimmy Connors is the champion; others show the round in which they were eliminated.

  Björn Borg (finalist)
  Jimmy Connors (champion)
  Guillermo Vilas (fourth round)
  Vitas Gerulaitis (semifinalist)
  Eddie Dibbs (third round)
  Brian Gottfried (quarterfinalist)
  Corrado Barazzutti (second round)
  Raúl Ramírez (quarterfinalist)
  Manuel Orantes (first round)
  Sandy Mayer (first round)
  Roscoe Tanner (fourth round)
  Harold Solomon (fourth round)
  José Luis Clerc (third round)
  Wojtek Fibak (third round)
  John McEnroe (semifinalist)
  Arthur Ashe (fourth round)

Draw

Key
 Q = Qualifier
 WC = Wild card
 LL = Lucky loser
 r = Retired

Final eight

Section 1

Section 2

Section 3

Section 4

Section 5

Section 6

Section 7

Section 8

References

External links
 Association of Tennis Professionals (ATP) – 1978 US Open Men's Singles draw
1978 US Open – Men's draws and results at the International Tennis Federation

Men's singles
US Open (tennis) by year – Men's singles